In France, the driving licence is a governmental right given to those who request a licence for any of the categories they desire. It is required for every type of motorized vehicle. The minimum age to obtain a driving licence is: sixteen years for a motorcycle, eighteen years for a car, and twenty-one years for buses and cargo vehicles.

Since 2013, the French driving licence format was changed from that of a pink booklet to a credit card-sized card. Some slight modifications appear on driving licences issued by some overseas collectivities such as French Polynesia, Saint Martin, and Wallis and Futuna. Licences from these collectivities are identical to the normal mainland format with the addition of the name of the collectivity next to “RÉPUBLIQUE FRANÇAISE” and, in the case of French Polynesia, the display of the regional flag on the bottom right part of the card. Since 2015, licences issued in Saint Barthélemy are similar to those of Metropolitan France but with the "SAINT BARTHÉLEMY" in place of “RÉPUBLIQUE FRANÇAISE”, without the yellow stars around the F, and the Saint Barthélémy coat of arms in the background of the licence.

Obtaining a driving licence

The French driving licence can be obtained after finishing driving school and passing a two-stage test: the theory test (examen du code de la route) and road test (examen pratique du permis). The code de la route exam consists of 40 questions of which one needs to get at least 35 right to pass. After passing the exam, one can start taking driving lessons with their driving school.
Before passing the road test, a minimum of 20 hours of driving lessons is required.

Graduated driver licensing

In France, there exists a graduated driver licensing(GDL) system for people between the ages of 15 and 17 and a half, for those holding a B category driving licence. Some restrictions exist, with one of the main conditions being that a driver with at least 5 years of uninterrupted license holding must accompany the learner.

This GDL is valid only within France, so it is not legal for a youth with a GDL to cross international borders in their car.

At the age of 18, one holding a learner's permit can apply for a normal driving license. The pros to this are that the learner can pass more easily due to having had prior experience driving, and the probationary period for their new licence is reduced from three to two years.

For people over 18 applying for a licence for the first time, a system similar to the GDL exists, but rules are slightly different. For instance, it does not provide the reduction from three to two years for the probation licence.

Furthermore, any person who initially gets a driving licence for the first time has to mind following restrictions for two or three years known as permis probatoire. The permis probatoire include:
 New drivers cannot drive as fast as seasoned drivers: 110 km/h instead of 130 on motorways, 100 km/h instead of 110, and 80 instead of 90 on rural roads.
 The symbol A should appear on the rear of the car
 The permis probatoire has only six points, the driver will have access to 12 points when they pass a three-year term

If points are docked, they can be recovered by attending traffic safety classes.

Gallery of historic images

See also
 European driving licence
 Vehicle registration plates of France
 French identity card
 French passport

References

External links

France
Road transport in France